Kero may refer to:

People
 Kero One, Korean-American hip hop producer and DJ
 Reino Kero (born 1939), Finnish historian
 Tanner Kero (born 1992), American ice hockey player

Places
 Kérő, Gherla, Hungary
 Lake Kero, Finland

Fictional characters
 Kero, legendary author of the Abrogans
 Kero-chan, a Cardcaptor Sakura character
 , a Vtuber from VirtuaReal (the Chinese branch of Nijisanji)

Other
 24503 Kero, a minor planet
 Kero or Qiru, an Andean drinking vessel
 KERO-TV, an American television station
 Kero Blaster, a video game

See also
 Quero (disambiguation)